Sun Media Corporation was the owner of several tabloid and broadsheet newspapers in Canada and the 49 percent owner of the now defunct Sun News Network. It was a subsidiary of Quebecor Media.

On October 6, 2014, Quebecor Media announced the sale of the remaining English-language print assets of Sun Media to rival Postmedia. The sale included neither the Sun News Network, which subsequently closed when a buyer was not found, nor Quebecor's French-language papers Le Journal de Montréal and Le Journal de Québec. The sale was approved by the federal Competition Bureau on March 25, 2015, and closed on April 13. Canoe Sun Media merged with Postmedia rather than being maintained as a separate division.

Quebecor had previously sold its community newspapers in Quebec to TC Transcontinental in June 2014, under a deal first announced in December 2013.

History
Sun Publishing was formed on February 4, 1978 through the amalgamation of Toronto Sun Holdings Ltd and Toronto Sun Publishing Ltd. The two companies had been formed in 1971 with the launch of the Toronto Sun by former staffers of the defunct Toronto Telegram. On February 14, 1978, the Edmonton Sun, the second member of what would become the Sun chain, was announced through a partnership of Sun Media and Edmonton Sun Publishing Ltd. The paper was launched on April 2, 1978. In 1981, the outstanding shares of Edmonton Sun Publishing Ltd were acquired by Sun Media. The company purchased the Calgary Albertan on July 31, 1980 for $1.3 million and relaunched it days later as the Calgary Sun, with the same format and appearance as its sister papers.

In 1983, 50% of Sun Media was acquired by Maclean-Hunter for $55 million. That same year, Sun Media, with Maclean-Hunter's backing, acquired the Houston Post for $100 million in an attempt to expand into the United States. It was sold for $150 million four years later. In 1987, Maclean-Hunter's Financial Post weekly was sold to Sun Media for $46 million and was relaunched as a daily tabloid financial newspaper the following year.  In 1988, Sun Media acquired the Ottawa Sunday Herald which it would relaunch as the daily Ottawa Sun.

In 1994, Maclean-Hunter was purchased by Rogers Communications. Two years later, on October 4, 1996, the management of the Sun chain under the leadership of Paul Godfrey purchased Rogers' share of the Sun Publishing and renamed the company Sun Media. In 1998, the Financial Post was sold to Southam Inc. in exchange for the Hamilton Spectator, the Kitchener-Waterloo Record, the Guelph Mercury, and the Cambridge Reporter. Also in 1998, Sun Media was purchased by Quebecor and maintained as a wholly owned subsidiary of it. Godfrey had sought out Quebecor as a "white knight" in order to frustrate an attempted hostile takeover by the Sun's longtime rival, the Toronto Star. In 1999, Quebcor sold the four recently acquired southern Ontario newspapers to the owners of the Toronto Star and became part of its Metroland Media Group. Southam, owned by Conrad Black, would relaunch the Financial Post as the National Post. In 2007, Sun Media acquired and absorbed the Osprey Media chain of small English language newspapers mostly based in Ontario. In 2014, after years of cuts and restructuring, Quebecor sold its Sun Media division to Postmedia which, ironically, had former Sun Media CEO Paul Godfrey as its chief executive. The sale was completed in April 2015 and Sun Media was dissolved with its newspapers being absorbed by the Postmedia chain.

Sun Media publications

Sun newspapers
 Calgary Sun
 Edmonton Sun
 Ottawa Sun
 Toronto Sun
 Winnipeg Sun

Le Journal newspapers
 Le Journal de Montréal
 Le Journal de Québec (Quebec City)

24hrs newspapers
 24heures Montreal
 24hrs Toronto
 24hrs Vancouver

Local daily newspapers

Alberta
 The Daily Herald-Tribune - Grande Prairie
 Fort McMurray Today - Fort McMurray

Manitoba
 Portage Daily Graphic - Portage la Prairie

Ontario
 Belleville Intelligencer - Belleville
 Brantford Expositor - Brantford
 Chatham Daily News - Chatham
 Cornwall Standard Freeholder - Cornwall
 Kingston Whig Standard - Kingston
 London Free Press - London
 Niagara Falls Review - Niagara Falls
 North Bay Nugget - North Bay
 Northumberland Today - Cobourg
 Orillia Packet and Times - Orillia
 Owen Sound Sun Times - Owen Sound
 Pembroke Daily Observer - Pembroke
 Peterborough Examiner - Peterborough
 Sarnia Observer - Sarnia
 Sault Star - Sault Ste. Marie
 Simcoe Reformer - Simcoe
 St. Catharines Standard - St. Catharines
 St. Thomas Times-Journal - St. Thomas
 Sudbury Star - Sudbury
 The Barrie Examiner - Barrie
 The Beacon Herald - Stratford
 The Recorder & Times - Brockville
 Timmins Daily Press - Timmins
 Welland Tribune - Welland
 Woodstock Sentinel-Review - Woodstock

Weekly newspapers

Alberta
 Airdrie Echo - Airdrie
 Bow Valley Crag & Canyon - Banff
 Camrose Canadian - Camrose
 Cochrane Times - Cochrane
 Cold Lake Sun - Cold Lake
 County Market - Leduc
 Devon Dispatch - Devon
 Drayton Valley Western Review - Drayton Valley
 Edmonton Examiner - Edmonton
 Edson Leader - Edson
 Fairview Post - Fairview
 Fort Saskatchewan Record - Fort Saskatchewan
 Hanna Herald - Hanna
 High River Times - High River
 Hinton Parklander - Hinton
 Lacombe Globe - Lacombe
 Leduc Representative - Leduc
 Mayerthorpe Freelancer - Mayerthorpe
 Meridian Booster - Lloydminster
 Nanton News - Nanton
 Peace Country Sun - Grande Prairie
 Peace River Record-Gazette - Peace River
 Pincher Creek Echo - Pincher Creek
 Sherwood Park News - Sherwood Park
 Spruce Grove Examiner - Spruce Grove
 Stony Plain Reporter - Stony Plain
 Strathmore Standard - Strathmore
 The Beaumont News - Beaumont
 Vermilion Standard - Vermilion
 Vulcan Advocate - Vulcan
 Wetaskiwin Times - Wetaskiwin
 Whitecourt Star - Whitecourt

Manitoba
 Altona Red River Valley Echo - Altona
 Carman Valley Leader - Carman
 Interlake Spectator - Gimli
 Morden Times - Morden
 Selkirk Journal - Selkirk
 Stonewall Argus and Teulon Times - Stonewall
 Winkler Times - Winkler

Ontario
 Bancroft This Week - Bancroft
 Barry's Bay This Week - Barry's Bay
 Bradford West Gwillimbury Times - Bradford
 Chatham This Week - Chatham
 Clinton News-Record - Clinton
 Cochrane Times-Post - Cochrane
 Collingwood Enterprise Bulletin - Collingwood
 County Weekly News - Prince Edward County
 Elliot Lake Standard - Elliot Lake
 Fort Erie Times - Fort Erie
 Frontenac This Week - Kingston
 Gananoque Reporter - Gananoque
 Goderich Signal Star - Goderich
 Haliburton Echo - Haliburton
 Hanover Post - Hanover
 Ingersoll Times - Ingersoll
 Innisfil Examiner - Innisfil
 InPort News - Port Colborne
 Kapuskasing Times - Kapuskasing
 Kenora Daily Miner and News - Kenora
 Kincardine News - Kincardine
 Kingston This Week - Kingston
 Lakeshore Advance - Grand Bend
 Lake of the Woods Enterprise - Kenora
 Leader-Spirit - Dresden
 Lucknow Sentinel - Lucknow
 Mid-North Monitor - Espanola
 Petrolia Topic - Petrolia

Saskatchewan
 Melfort Journal - Melfort
 Nipawin Journal - Nipawin

Other publications

Magazines
 Biz Magazine
 Business London
 Hamilton Halton Weddings
 Hamilton Magazine
 Kingston Life
 Muskoka Cottage Home Property
 Muskoka Magazine
 Muskoka Trails
 Niagara Magazine
 Ontario Farmer
 Sault Good Life
 Simcoe Life
 Vines Magazine
 What's Up Muskoka

Former assets
The following publications have been closed by Sun Media:

 24 Hours in Ottawa, Calgary and Edmonton
 Canmore Leader, Canmore, Alberta (merged to become the Bow Valley Crag & Canyon in 2013)
 Banff Crag & Canyon, Banff, Alberta (merged to become the Bow Valley Crag & Canyon in 2013)
 The Beausejour Review, Beausejour, Manitoba
 The Lac du Bonnet Leader, Lac du Bonnet, Manitoba
 The Lindsay Daily Post, Lindsay, Ontario
 Midland Free Press, Midland, Ontario
 L’Action Régionale Montérégie, Montérégie, Québec
 Le Magazine Saint-Lambert, Saint-Lambert, Quebec
 Le Progrès de Bellechasse, Bellechasse, Quebec
 The Meadow Lake Progress, Meadow Lake, Saskatchewan
 The Crowsnest Pass Promoter, Crowsnest Pass, Alberta
 CKXT-DT - closed 2011
 Sun News Network

Sold
Houston Post, Houston, Texas (acquired in 1983, sold in 1987)
The Hamilton Spectator, Hamilton, Ontario (acquired 1998, sold in 1999)
Kitchener-Waterloo Record, Kitchener, Ontario (acquired 1998, sold in 1999)
Guelph Mercury, Guelph, Ontario (acquired 1998, sold in 1999)
Cambridge Reporter, Cambridge, Ontario (acquired 1998, sold in 1999)
 CP24 - 29.9% interest sold to CHUM Limited in 2004. Now owned by Bell Media.

References

External links
Official Sun Media website

Newspaper companies of Canada
Quebecor
Toronto Sun
Postmedia Network publications
Publishing companies established in 1978
Publishing companies disestablished in 2015
Defunct publishing companies of Canada